The 1966 Taça de Portugal Final was the final match of the 1965–66 Taça de Portugal, the 26th season of the Taça de Portugal, the premier Portuguese football cup competition organized by the Portuguese Football Federation (FPF). The match was played on 22 May 1966 at the Estádio Nacional in Oeiras, and opposed two Primeira Liga sides: Braga and Vitória de Setúbal. Braga defeated Vitória de Setúbal 1–0 to claim the Taça de Portugal for the first time.

Match

Details

References

1966
Taca
S.C. Braga matches
Vitória F.C. matches